John Charles Traylen ARIBA (27 February 1845 - 11 June 1907) was an English architect.

Life

He was born at Sibson in Huntingdonshire, and educated at Oundle School and Northampton Grammar School. He was admitted a student of the Royal Academy of British Architects. He became an articled pupil of William Millican of Leicester from 1858 to 1863. He then became an assistant to John Johnson in London whom he assisted in designing Alexandra Palace.

He then moved to be an assistant of Frederick Webster Ordish and later became his partner. Together they produced St Paul's Church, Leicester, St Leonard’s Church, Leicester and several other buildings in the city.

In 1877 he moved to Peterborough and was appointed surveyor for the Archdeaconry of Oakham, which he held until 1894. He was also surveyor to the Archdeaconry of Lincoln. He did restoration work to many churches including St George's Church, Stamford where there is a stained glass window to his memory by Hugh Arnold.

On 20 March 1882 he was appointed Associate of the Royal Institute of British Architects.

In 1884 he bought the practice of Edward Browning of Broad Street, Stamford and continued working here until his death. He died at his home in Broad Street, Stamford on 11 June 1907. His son Henry Francis Traylen joined the practice which became Traylen and Son in 1906 and in 1921 Traylen and Lenton.

Works
St Paul's Church, Leicester 1871
Stamford School of Art 1895

References

1845 births
Associates of the Royal Institute of British Architects
1907 deaths
Architects from Lincolnshire
People educated at Oundle School
People educated at Northampton School for Boys